Butler Hospital is a private, non-profit, psychiatric and substance abuse hospital for adolescents, adults, and seniors, located at 345 Blackstone Boulevard in Providence, Rhode Island. The hospital is affiliated with the Warren Alpert Medical School of Brown University, and is the flagship for Brown University's renowned department of psychiatry. Butler Hospital was a founding member, along with Women & Infants Hospital and Kent Hospital, of the Care New England health system in 1996.

History
The facility was founded in 1844 as Rhode Island's first exclusively mental health hospital. Industrialist Cyrus Butler donated heavily to the hospital, and it was named in his honor. Local Yankee philanthropist Nicholas Brown, Jr. also bequeathed a large amount of money to construct a mental health hospital which was used to fund the early hospital.
Butler Hospital's Gothic Revival complex was built beginning with its founding in 1844, and includes a 1731 farmhouse that stood on the property when it was acquired by the hospital.  The hospital complex was listed on the National Register of Historic Places in 1976.

In 1996, Butler Hospital joined with Women & Infants Hospital and Kent Hospital to create the Care New England Health System in order to continually improve the health and well-being of the people in the communities they serve.

Current operations
Butler Hospital is southeastern New England's only adolescent, and adult and senior psychiatric treatment center, providing assessments and treatment for all major psychiatric illnesses and substance abuse. There are six treatment units in the hospital's inpatient program and their partial (or day) hospital makes up an additional three units.  Butler no longer has children's programs, as those were taken over by Bradley Hospital in East Providence.

As an internationally recognized research center, Butler participates in many research initiatives including studies in major depression, obsessive compulsive disorder, Alzheimer's disease and other memory disorders, depression and anxiety in dementia caregivers, substance abuse and family violence, smoking cessation, and movement disorders such as Parkinson's disease.

Butler Hospital employs approximately 950 full-time and part-time, clinical and non-clinical staff, in addition to more than 50 volunteers who assist in nearly all areas of the hospital.

Mary Marran is the President and Chief Operating Officer, and the Chairman of the Board is George W. Shuster.

Recognition
 Named one of the nation's 30 best psychiatric hospitals by a 2004 U.S. News & World Report

See also
List of hospitals in Rhode Island
National Register of Historic Places listings in Providence, Rhode Island

References

Hospital buildings completed in 1844
Psychiatric hospitals in Rhode Island
Buildings and structures in Providence, Rhode Island
Brown University
National Register of Historic Places in Providence, Rhode Island
Hospital buildings on the National Register of Historic Places in Rhode Island
1844 establishments in Rhode Island